Rise is a 2022 comedy drama film directed by Cédric Klapisch, from a screenplay by Klapisch and Santiago Amigorena.

Premise
Elise, a promising classical dancer, tries to find a new direction in contemporary dancing after getting injured during a performance.

Cast
Marion Barbeau as Élise
Hofesh Shechter as himself
Denis Podalydès as Henri
Muriel Robin as Josiane
Pio Marmaï as Loïc
François Civil as Yann
Souheila Yacoub as Sabrina
Mehdi Baki as himself
Alexia Giordano as herself
Robinson Cassarino as himself
Damien Chapelle as Julien

Production
The principal photography began on 21 December 2020 in Paris, France and lasted for nine weeks. The shooting also took place in Brittany and Morbihan.

Accolades

References

External links

2022 comedy-drama films
2020s French-language films
Films directed by Cédric Klapisch
Films shot in Paris